Gavin Friels (born 3 August 1977) is a Scottish football forward who is currently player-manager at Dalry Thistle in the Scottish Junior Football Association, West Region. He has previously played in the Scottish Football League First Division with Stranraer.

Career
Friels started his career with Queen of the South but did not make any league appearances for the club. He dropped to Junior level at his hometown side Dalry Thistle before moving to Stranraer in December 1996. With the Galloway club, Friels won the Scottish Football League Second Division championship in 1997–1998 and the following season made 19 appearances in the Scottish Football League First Division, scoring once in a 7–1 defeat to Ayr United in September 1998. Friels left Stranraer for Junior side Auchinleck Talbot in the summer of 1999.

After scoring two goals against Maryhill on the final day of the season to help save Talbot from relegation in 2004, Friels moved on to Pollok the following season. During his time at 'Lok, Friels was capped for the Scotland Junior international team in the 2005 Quadrangular Tournament. He stepped up to the Scottish Football League again for a short spell with Ayr United in 2006 but was soon back in the Juniors, firstly on loan to Glenafton Athletic in November 2006 then permanently to Auchinleck Talbot in February 2007 after being released by Ayr. Friels failed to settle at Talbot a second time and joined Irvine Meadow in November 2007.

Friels was out of the game for a period of fourteen months following an injury suffered in a game against Arthurlie in January 2009, returning to action in March 2010. The player joined Cumnock Juniors in February 2011 before signing for Kilbirnie Ladeside in 2012.

Friels was announced as player-manager of Dalry Thistle in March 2013.

References

External links
 
 

1977 births
Living people
Queen of the South F.C. players
Stranraer F.C. players
Dalry Thistle F.C. players
Auchinleck Talbot F.C. players
Glenafton Athletic F.C. players
Pollok F.C. players
Ayr United F.C. players
Cumnock Juniors F.C. players
Kilbirnie Ladeside F.C. players
Footballers from Irvine, North Ayrshire
Scottish Football League players
Scottish Junior Football Association players
Scottish footballers
Association football forwards
Scottish Junior Football Association managers
Scottish football managers